Darren Collins (born 1969) is a Paralympic athletics competitor from Australia.  He won a pair of bronze medals at the 1992 Barcelona Games in the Men's 200 m B1 event and the Men's 400 m B1 event.

References

Paralympic athletes of Australia
Athletes (track and field) at the 1992 Summer Paralympics
Paralympic bronze medalists for Australia
Living people
Medalists at the 1992 Summer Paralympics
1969 births
Paralympic medalists in athletics (track and field)
Australian male sprinters
Visually impaired sprinters
Paralympic sprinters
Medalists at the World Para Athletics Championships